Jessica Wittner (born 1983) is a lieutenant commander in the United States Navy and NASA astronaut candidate.

Life
Wittner is a native of California with a distinguished career serving on active duty as a naval aviator and test pilot. As a teenager she joined the Naval Sea Cadet Corps, where she attained the highest rank, Chief Petty Officer. She holds a Bachelor of Science in aerospace engineering from the University of Arizona, and a Master of Science in aerospace engineering from the U.S. Naval Postgraduate School. Wittner was commissioned as a naval officer through an enlisted-to-officer program and has served operationally flying F/A-18 fighter jets with Strike Fighter Squadron 34 in Virginia Beach, Virginia, and Strike Fighter Squadron 151 in Lemoore, California. A graduate of U.S. Naval Test Pilot School, she also worked as a test pilot and project officer with Air Test and Evaluation Squadron 31 in China Lake, California.
On December 6, 2021, Wittner was formally announced as a NASA astronaut candidate with NASA Astronaut Group 23.

References

Astronaut candidates

University of Arizona alumni

1983 births
Living people